Izabela Jadwiga Kisio-Skorupa (born September 11, 1958 in Szczecin) is a Polish media personality. A polarizing and oft-derided celebrity, she is the mother of actress Aleksandra Kisio and has been proclaimed "the best-known mother in the Polish show business".

Biography 
Izabela Skorupa was raised a Roman Catholic, although she is of Jewish origin. After graduating from Krzysztof Kamil Baczyński High School in Szczecin, she entered a relationship with Marek Kisio, a Polish local government activist from Stargard, from whom she is currently divorced. They have one daughter.

Having left her husband and their co-owned automotive company, she moved to Warsaw with her daughter. At this time she began receiving her first paparazzi attention. She assumed minor roles in several productions, including Niania, Sędzia Anna Maria Wesołowska, Malanowski i partnerzy, and Ukryta prawda. 

She attempted to gain entry to the Telekamery awards ceremony, at which she was said to have attacked a security guard who did not let her in. Inspired by many articles about her and as a counterattack, in September that year, she decided to start her own videoblog on social media, primarily Facebook, which she named Rzetelnym okiem Izabeli. Her publications grew both in controversy and popularity due to their vulgar tone and incorrect orthography.

In 2015–2016, in cooperation with the Telewizja Internetowa ATV based in Warsaw, she was the presenter of Modowy rentgen and Piekielny motel programs on Afera na dywaniku YouTube channel. Having debuted on YouTube, in an interview to Na językach TVN program, she was presented as a fashion blogger. In 2017, she found out about her daughter's wedding to Łukasz Zieliński in the press.

In 2020, she continued her Modowy rentgen project and a part of its episodes, dedicated to face masks, was used in the state media news channel. She began cooperation with the Swarzędz publishing house Boro Inc. Celebration Productions, under whose wings, together with Julia Jaroszewska, after making a guest appearance in her music video Kogel mogel (Imprezy nadszedł czas), she recorded her first single titled Sex i kasa. On the YouTube channel DNA Television, she hosted the talkshow Izabela TV star and the program Ostre jazdy, shot in Poznań.

In July 2021, she appeared as an MMA fighter at the Open Fights Night gala organized at Plaża Patelnia near Płock, where she lost to Julia Jaroszewska.

Discography

Singles 

 SEX I Kasa (with Martino Lopez and Julia Jaroszewska) (2020)
 Ostre Jazdy (with Janisky) (2021)
 Dziś (with Julia Jaroszewska) (2021)
 Zamknij Morde (with Sandra S) (2021)
 Tylko z Nią (with Lasuczita) (2023)

References

1958 births
Living people
Polish actresses
Polish people of Jewish descent
Businesspeople from Szczecin